PARAFE (abbreviation of Passage Automatisé Rapide Aux Frontières Extérieures or automated fast-track crossing at external borders) is a passport verification program operated by France's Direction centrale de la police aux frontières (DCPAF; border police). PARAFE, incorporating automated self-service barriers operated by DCPAF, is located at immigration checkpoints in the arrival and departure halls at the Paris, Marseille, Nice and Lyon airports and at London St. Pancras railway station, offering an alternative to using desks staffed by immigration officers. The gates use facial recognition technology to verify the user's identity against the data stored in the chip in their biometric passport.

Eligibility
At present, citizens of the following countries can use the PARAFE eGates, provided that they are aged 18 years or over and hold valid biometric passports.

Minors aged 12–17 who hold a valid biometric passport from the above table are also eligible to use the gates on arrival, but not on departure because the French authorities have strict rules about unaccompanied minors leaving the country.

Prior to 30 March 2019, only EU/EEA and Swiss biometric passport holders could use the PARAFE Gates. On 30 March 2019, eligibility was extended to Andorran, Monegasque and San Marinese biometric passport holders. On 31 December 2020, eligibility was further extended to Australian, Canadian, Japanese, New Zealand, Singaporean, South Korean and United States biometric passport holders, and continued for British passport holders after the end of the Brexit transition period.

Operation
To use the PARAFE gates, the traveller must have a biometric passport from France and certain other countries (these ePassports have the biometric logo on the front cover). A computer in the gate scanner reads all the information contained in the chip inside the passport, while a camera takes a picture of the passenger from which biometric patterns are verified against those from the picture saved in the passport chip. The ePassport gate scanner reads all the information contained in the chip inside the passport and runs the data against numerous databases to determine if the traveller is a security risk, while a camera takes a picture of the traveller and an officer at a control station behind the gates checks that the image captured by the camera matches the one on the passport (facial recognition). Once the data verification and facial recognition process is complete, doors will automatically either open, signifying that the traveller is permitted to enter and/or exit the country, or remain closed and a stop icon illuminate, demonstrating that the traveller has failed the security checks and will personally meet with immigration officials.

Availability

At present, PARAFE eGates are available at the following locations:
 Paris Charles de Gaulle Airport
 Paris Orly Airport
 Bordeaux–Mérignac Airport
 EuroAirport Basel Mulhouse Freiburg
 Marseille Provence Airport
 Lyon–Saint-Exupéry Airport
 Nice Airport
 Eurostar Paris Gare du Nord Terminal (juxtaposed controls)
 Eurostar London St Pancras Terminal (juxtaposed controls)
 Eurotunnel Folkestone Terminal (juxtaposed controls)
 Eurotunnel Calais Terminal (juxtaposed controls)

History
The previous generation of the PARAFE eGates used fingerprint technology verify the identity of the passenger and was first introduced in 2010. This was phased out since it was considered "insufficiently intuitive" (which hand, which finger), a slower process and non-French citizens had to actively sign up at a French airport every 5 years to be able to use the eGates.

The first eGates were replaced in early 2017 for a pilot project of the facial recognition technology, which was extended to more airports and St Pancras station throughout the rest of 2017 and 2018. There are still some gates left that work with the fingerprint technology and new registrations are still accepted.

See also
 ePassport Gates - a similar system operated in the United Kingdom
 SmartGate - a similar system operated in Australia
 European Automated Border Control systems

External links
Crossing Borders: PARAFE, the automated immigration gates

References

Authentication methods
Biometric databases
Biometrics
Expedited border crossing schemes
Fingerprints
Identification